Fernando Rui Valadares Pinto Sampaio (born 29 May 1987) is a Portuguese professional footballer who plays for S.C. Beira-Mar as a defensive midfielder.

Club career
Born in Vila Pouca de Aguiar, Vila Real District, Sampaio spent his first four seasons as a senior in the Segunda Liga, appearing in the competition for G.D. Chaves, F.C. Penafiel and S.C. Beira-Mar. In 2009–10, he scored a career-best six goals for the latter club to help it to return to the Primeira Liga after a three-year absence.

Sampaio made his debut in the Portuguese top division on 15 August 2010, coming on as 29th-minute substitute in a 0–0 home draw against U.D. Leiria. He went on to start in 28 of his 30 appearances, helping his team to retain their recently-acquired status; on 18 September, he scored in the 1–1 draw with C.S. Marítimo also at the Estádio Municipal de Aveiro.

On 31 August 2011, Sampaio signed with Serie A side Cagliari Calcio for €600,000. He played only seven competitive matches during his stint in Italy (one goal, in the Coppa Italia), being consecutively loaned to S.C. Olhanense and Beira-Mar and being released in January 2014, following which he agreed to a permanent one-and-a-half-year contract at F.C. Arouca also in his country's top flight.

In the summer of 2015, Bastos joined French Ligue 2 team Red Star F.C. alongside his compatriot Vítor Bastos. He was sparingly played at the Stade Jean-Bouin, and from January 2017 onwards resumed his career in the Portuguese second tier, where he represented S.C. Freamunde and C.D. Cova da Piedade.

References

External links

1987 births
Living people
Sportspeople from Vila Real District
Portuguese footballers
Association football midfielders
Primeira Liga players
Liga Portugal 2 players
Campeonato de Portugal (league) players
G.D. Chaves players
F.C. Penafiel players
S.C. Beira-Mar players
S.C. Olhanense players
S.C. Freamunde players
F.C. Arouca players
Associação Académica de Coimbra – O.A.F. players
C.D. Cova da Piedade players
Serie A players
Cagliari Calcio players
Ligue 2 players
Red Star F.C. players
Portuguese expatriate footballers
Expatriate footballers in Italy
Expatriate footballers in France
Portuguese expatriate sportspeople in Italy
Portuguese expatriate sportspeople in France